Year 1043 (MXLIII) was a common year starting on Saturday (link will display the full calendar) of the Julian calendar.

Events 
 By place 

 Byzantine Empire 
 Spring – Emperor Constantine IX Monomachos sends a Byzantine expeditionary force to the Balkans against the rebellious George Maniakes, governor of the Catepanate of Italy. The two armies meet near Thessaloniki in northern Greece. The rebel army – better organized, seasoned and with superior leadership – fights initially successful, but Maniakes is killed by an arrow at the moment of his triumph. After this, his army is routed.
 Rus'–Byzantine War: A Kievan Rus' naval raid, led by Grand Prince Vladimir Yaraslavich, unsuccessfully attacks Constantinople. A 6,000-strong Kievan contingent under Vyshata is also defeated and deported to the capital.

 Europe 
 Spring – A grand assembly at Melfi, with all the Norman and Lombard nobles acclaim Guaimar IV, duke of Apulia and Calabria. The territories are divided into 12 fiefdoms and distributed among Norman chieftains. William Iron Arm is granted Ascoli as a private fiefdom and his brother Drogo of Hauteville is granted Venosa. Count Rainulf II of Aversa, not present at the assembly, receives Siponto and recognizes Guaimar's suzerainty.
 Grand Prince Yaroslav the Wise of Kiev makes an agreement with Duke Casimir I the Restorer of Poland that recognizes Chervyen as part of Kiev. The agreement is sealed with a double marriage – Casimir to Maria Dobroniega (a daughter of Vladimir the Great), and Iziaslav to Gertrude, Casimir's sister. 
 November 21 – King Henry III ("the Black") marries Agnes of Poitou (daughter of William V of Aquitaine) at the Imperial Palace at Ingelheim am Rhein. She is his second wife after the death of Gunhilda from malaria in 1038.

 England 
 April 3 – Edward the Confessor is crowned king of England at Winchester Cathedral. He learns that his mother, Queen Emma of Normandy is plotting with Magnus the Good to take control of the English throne. Edward strips her land and treasure, but she is allowed to stay in England.

 Arabian Empire 
 The Seljuqs under Tughril Beg expel the Oghuz Turks from Khorasan and conquer Qazvin (modern Iran). They become the new masters of the Ziyarid Dynasty (approximate date).

 Africa 
 The first king of the Kingdom of Nri, Eze Nri Ìfikuánim, is installed in West Africa.

 Asia 
 In China, the statesmen Ouyang Xiu and Fan Zhongyan put forth the Qingli Reforms during the Song Dynasty, which are halted by 1045.

Births 
 Abu Muhammad al-Baghawi, Persian hadith scholar (d. 1122)
 Áurea of San Millán, Spanish anchorite and saint (d. 1070)
 Fulk IV ("the Quarreller"), French nobleman (d. 1109)
 Furong Daokai, Chinese Zen Buddhist monk (d. 1118)
 Isaac ben Reuben Albargeloni, Spanish Jewish rabbi
 El Cid (Rodrigo Diaz de Vivar), Spanish nobleman (d. 1099)

Deaths 
 February 14 – Gisela of Swabia, Holy Roman Empress (b. 990)
 February 20 – Alexios Stoudites, patriarch of Constantinople
 June 26 – Gonzalo Sánchez, Spanish nobleman (b. 1020)
 July 26 – Moses the Hungarian, Kievan Russian monk
 Al-Muqtana Baha'uddin, Druze religious leader (b. 979)
 Cathal mac Ruaidhri, king of Maigh Seóla (Ireland) 
 George Maniakes, Byzantine general and governor
 Hallvard Vebjørnsson, Norwegian patron saint
 Hywel ab Owain, king of Glywysing (Wales)

References